Philip Heijnen (born 25 June 2000) is a Dutch professional track and road cyclist, who currently rides for UCI Continental team .

Major results
2019
 National Track Championships
1st  Team pursuit
1st  Derny
2021
 1st  Derny, National Track Championships
 3rd  Madison (with Vincent Hoppezak), UEC European Under-23 Track Championships
2022
 UEC European Under-23 Track Championships
1st  Madison (with Yanne Dorenbos)
3rd  Omnium
 National Track Championships
1st  Points race
1st  Madison
1st  Derny
2023
 3rd  Elimination race, UEC European Track Championships

References

External links

2000 births
Living people
Dutch male cyclists
People from Land van Cuijk
Dutch track cyclists
21st-century Dutch people